is a Japanese manga series written and illustrated by Rie Kano. It was serialized in Shogakukan's seinen manga magazine Weekly Big Comic Spirits from August 2016 to May 2018.

Publication
Shogakukan collected its chapters in seven tankōbon volumes, released from October 28, 2016, to October 30, 2018.

Volume list

References

External links
 

Romantic comedy anime and manga
Seinen manga
Shogakukan manga